Eoin G. Harty (born November 23, 1962, in Dublin, Ireland) is a Thoroughbred racehorse trainer in the United States. From a family of horsemen, Eoin (pronounced Owen) Harty is the fourth generation to be involved in racing. At age sixteen he went to work at the Irish National Stud then a year later moved to the United States, working in the business in California where he still makes his home.

Harty worked for notable stables such as that of Allen E. Paulson and eventually became an assistant to trainers John Russell and then Bob Baffert. In 2000, he took charge of the training of two-year-olds for the North American division of Sheikh Mohammed's Godolphin Racing. In 2001, Eoin Harty got his big break as he conditioned Godolphin's Tempera who won the Breeders' Cup Juvenile Fillies and earned American Champion Two-Year-Old Filly honors.

In 2007, Eoin Harty began conditioning horses for WinStar Farm and has met with considerable success, notably winning the 2008 Travers Stakes with Colonel John and the  2009 Dubai World Cup with Well Armed.

References
 Eoin Harty's personal racing website
 Eoin Harty at the NTRA

1962 births
Living people
American horse trainers
Irish racehorse trainers
Sportspeople from Dublin (city)